Mary, Lady Cheke (née Hill;  - 30 November 1616) was an English lady of the privy chamber to Elizabeth I, as well as a courtier poet, and epigrammatist.

Biography
Born Mary Hill in Hampshire around 1532. Her father was Richard Hill (d. 1539), of Hartley Wintney; he had served as Sergeant of the Wine Cellar to Henry VIII. After her father's death, her mother remarried Sir John Mason. 

On 11 May 1547, she married Sir John Cheke of Mottistone Manor, an English classical scholar and statesman. They had at least three children, the sons, Henry, John, and Edward. After Mary Tudor became Queen in 1554, Mary Cheke's husband left England. From Calais, he requested of Sir John Harrington to look after his wife. John Cheke died in 1557. Late in 1558, Mary Cheke married Henry Macwilliam of Stambourne Hall, a royal pensioner, but retained the surname Cheke.

She is remembered as an important attendant to Elizabeth I, and for a "witty poetic exchange" at her court.  In the late 1590s, Harrington wrote an epigram with negative connotations regarding women in the Bible, and Cheke wrote back a lyrically-clever counter-epigram, "Erat quaedam mulier (a reply to John Harrington's poem, Erat quidem homo)".

Cheke died 30 November 1616.

Selected works
 "Erat quaedam mulier (a reply to John Harrington's poem, Erat quidem homo)", late 1590s

References

Bibliography
 
 

1532 births
1616 deaths
16th-century English poets
Ladies of the Privy Chamber
16th-century English women writers
16th-century English writers
Epigrammatists
English women poets
People from Hampshire (before 1974)
Wives of knights
Court of Elizabeth I